North Toowoomba was an electoral district of the Legislative Assembly in the Australian state of Queensland. It was created with the 1950 redistribution and removed by the 1960 redistribution.

The seat was based on the City of Toowoomba.

The sitting member, John Duggan, successfully stood for election in the new seat of Toowoomba West in the 1960 election.

Members for North Toowoomba

See also
 Historical Seats of Toowoomba
 Electoral districts of Queensland
 Members of the Queensland Legislative Assembly by year
 :Category:Members of the Queensland Legislative Assembly by name

References

Darling Downs
Toowoomba
North Toowoomba
1950 establishments in Australia
1960 disestablishments in Australia
Constituencies established in 1950
Constituencies disestablished in 1960